Mindshadow may refer to:

 Mindshadow (novel), a 1986 novel
 Mindshadow (video game), a 1984 graphic adventure game